Ferreira do Alentejo, or simply Ferreira, is a town and a municipality in Beja District in Portugal. The population in 2011 was 8,255, in an area of 648.25 km2.

The human activity in the municipality dates back to antiquity, with evidence of prehistoric and Roman settlement. The village was later part of the Order of Santiago da Espada, having its first charter passed on 5 March 1516 by King Manuel I.

The present Mayor is Aníbal Coelho Costa, elected by the Socialist Party. The municipal holiday is March 5.

Parishes
Administratively, the municipality is divided into 4 civil parishes (freguesias):
 Alfundão e Peroguarda
 Ferreira do Alentejo e Canhestros
 Figueira dos Cavaleiros
 Odivelas

References

External links
Town Hall official website
Photos from Ferreira do Alentejo
Some more Photos from Ferreira do Alentejo
Ferreira do Alentejo Geocoin

 
Towns in Portugal
Populated places in Beja District
Municipalities of Beja District